The Queen's Head was an LGBT-friendly pub and lounge in Portland, Oregon. This establishment closed in 2022.

Description 

The Queen's Head was an English-style pub and lounge in Ankeny Alley, a pedestrian-friendly zone with clubs and restaurants including Dan and Louis Oyster Bar, Shanghai Tunnel Bar, and Voodoo Doughnut, in the Southwest Portland part of the Old Town Chinatown neighborhood.

Andrew Jankowski of Eater Portland and the Portland Mercury called the business a drag bar and gay club. Conner Reed and Thom Hilton of Eater Portland described The Queen's Head as a queer bar and English pub inspired by the owner's time in London. The owner said the space was inclusive and queer, not specifically gay or lesbian.

The business hosted drag shows and burlesque performances regularly; other events included "queer art recess", drag queen piano shows, karaoke, poetry slam, a "queer prom party", storytelling, talent shows, and trivia.

Menu
The Queen's Head offered "a shifting menu of bar snacks and comfort food drawn from across the U.K.'s Commonwealth". The menu included: baked Brazilian coxhina dumplings, curry hand pies, coronation chicken sandwiches (roasted chicken with grapes and chutney), cucumber and watercress sandwiches, sausage rolls, Scotch eggs, shepherd's pie, and charcuterie boards with chicken and lamb skewers, roasted mushrooms, and cheeses served on tiered high tea trays. Supper club specials included marinated pulled pork or oysters, with sautéed mushrooms and marinated shredded vegetables and vegan substitutes.

According to Reed and Hilton, The Queen's Head offered the city's "most extensive" menu of non-alcoholic cocktails with peach turmeric tea and rose five-spice simple "amping up the average soda".

History 
Owner Daniel Bund opened The Queen's Head in late November 2021, during the COVID-19 pandemic. The business occupied the space which previously housed Berbati's Pan and Tryst. Writing for Willamette Week, Jankowski described the pub's launch as an "overt return of the LGBTQ+ community to Ankeny Alley". Antha Hansen served as chef, as of 2021. In March 2022, Bund sought funding to improve the bar, kitchen equipment, and outdoor seating.

Transition to Pinq and closure 

The Queen's Head closed in July, and a worker-owned cooperative known as The Queen's Collective began operating the queer cafe as Pinq (sometimes stylized as P¡nq) starting in September. Pinq took over the lease and also ran a 501(c)(3) organization called Cqnnectiqn, which raised funds to help achieve Pinq's goals of "provocative artistic expression, rad economics, anti-oppression organizing and Queer culture keeping".

According to Jankowski, The Queen's Collective opposed gentrification, oppression, and racism, and Pinq intended to fill a void left by the closure of The Roxy. The collective once had fifteen employees, but dwindled to three by the time Pinq opened in September 2022: Antha Pereira, who served as general manager, Ti Rayn, a public relations and social media manager, and Astrid Stark. The group worked with approximately 50 drag artists and event producers, and Pinq hosted "burlesque shows, open mics, makers markets, viewing parties for shows like The Boulet Brothers' Dragula, and even bake sales". Pinq sought to book trans and nonbinary performers of color. The restaurant began serving Southern-style soul food such as chicken sandwiches, okra étouffée, and oxtails. Pinq acquired The Roxy's espresso machine. The business suffered a series of hardships before closing in November 2022. A post on Pinq's social media account said, "[People] didn't fuck with the vision, and those who did were too economically maligned to save us. Just regular failure under capitalism."

References

External links 

 
 

2021 establishments in Oregon
2022 disestablishments in Oregon
Defunct LGBT drinking establishments in Oregon
Defunct restaurants in Portland, Oregon
LGBT culture in Portland, Oregon
Old Town Chinatown
Restaurants disestablished in 2022
Restaurants established in 2021
Southwest Portland, Oregon